is a passenger railway station on the Keisei Main Line in the city of Ichikawa, Chiba Japan, operated by the private railway operator Keisei Electric Railway.

Lines
Onigoe Station is served by the Keisei Main Line, and is located 20.1 km from the terminus of the line at Keisei-Ueno Station.

Station layout
The station consists of a single island platform connected via a footbridge to the station building.

Platforms

History
The station was renamed to its present name on 1 February 1943.

Station numbering was introduced to all Keisei Line stations on 17 July 2010. Keisei Sekiya was assigned station number KS17.

Passenger statistics
In fiscal 2019, the station was used by an average of 5811 passengers daily.

Surrounding area
 National Tax Agency Ichikawa Tax Office
 Higashiyama Kaii Memorial Hall
 Ichikawa Junior & Senior High School
 Ichikawa Municipal Fourth Junior High School

See also
 List of railway stations in Japan

References

External links

 Keisei Station information 

Railway stations in Japan opened in 1935
Railway stations in Chiba Prefecture
Keisei Main Line
Ichikawa, Chiba